Edwin Reyes was the Cook County Commissioner for the County’s 8th district, in northwest Chicago. He held the position as a Democrat from 2009–2014.

Education
Reyes attended Northern Illinois University in the early 1980s, after which he enlisted in the United States Air Force from 1983-1986 on active duty and eventually earned his bachelor's degree in Liberal Arts from Northeastern Illinois University in 1996.

Political career
Reyes served as Chief of Staff for Chicago Alderman Rey Colón from 2003–2004.  From 2006–2009, Reyes served as a state trooper on the security detail for governor Rod Blagojevich.

County Commissioner
One of Reyes' first official votes as commissioner was to override John Stroger's veto of a sales tax cut in 2009.  During the 2010 election, Reyes listed his top three priorities as healthcare access, violence prevention, and educational resources.  The Chicago Tribune declined to endorse him that year, reporting that "Reyes answers to the men who sent him, Democratic bosses Dick Mell and Joseph Berrios."

In 2013, Reyes supported a $25 tax on gun sales proposed by Toni Preckwinkle.  Reyes chaired the committees on veterans and law enforcement.

References 

Puerto Rican people in Illinois politics
American politicians of Puerto Rican descent
Hispanic and Latino American politicians
Illinois Democrats
Living people
Members of the Cook County Board of Commissioners
United States Air Force airmen
Year of birth missing (living people)
Northeastern Illinois University alumni